The India national cricket team toured Pakistan during the 1954–55 cricket season. They played five Test matches against the Pakistan cricket team, with the series drawn 0–0. It was the first Test series to be played in Pakistan.

Test matches

1st Test

2nd Test

3rd Test

4th Test

5th Test

References

Further reading

External links
 Tour home at ESPN Cricinfo
 

1954 in Indian cricket
1955 in Indian cricket
1954 in Pakistani cricket
1955 in Pakistani cricket
1954–55
Pakistani cricket seasons from 1947–48 to 1969–70
International cricket competitions from 1945–46 to 1960